Dalbert Henrique Chagas Estevão (born 8 September 1993), known as Dalbert, is a Brazilian professional footballer who plays as a left-back for Italian club Inter Milan.

Club career
Dalbert started his career in Brazil and moved to Portugal for Académico de Viseu in 2013, where he played a total of 45 appearances and scored 2 goals before moving to Vitória de Guimarães in 2015.

Dalbert joined OGC Nice in 2016 from Vitória de Guimarães. He made his Ligue 1 debut on 14 August 2016 against Stade Rennais playing the full match.

On 9 August 2017, Dalbert joined Inter Milan. He made his debut in a 3–1 victory over A.S. Roma.

On 29 August 2019, Dalbert was loaned to ACF Fiorentina for the duration of the 2019–20 season.

Career statistics

Club

References

External links
 

1993 births
Living people
Brazilian footballers
Brazilian expatriate footballers
Association football defenders
Primeira Liga players
Liga Portugal 2 players
Ligue 1 players
Serie A players
Académico de Viseu F.C. players
Vitória S.C. players
OGC Nice players
Inter Milan players
ACF Fiorentina players
Stade Rennais F.C. players
Cagliari Calcio players
Expatriate footballers in Portugal
Expatriate footballers in France
Expatriate footballers in Italy
Brazilian expatriate sportspeople in Portugal
Brazilian expatriate sportspeople in France
Brazilian expatriate sportspeople in Italy
Sportspeople from Rio de Janeiro (state)
People from Barra Mansa